Fikru Deguefu (born 28 February 1937) is an Ethiopian long-distance runner. He competed in the men's 5000 metres at the 1968 Summer Olympics, ranking 8th in the final. He also competed in the men's 10,000 metres, ranking 14th in the final.

References

External links
 

1937 births
Living people
Athletes (track and field) at the 1968 Summer Olympics
Ethiopian male long-distance runners
Olympic athletes of Ethiopia
Place of birth missing (living people)